This is a list of retronyms used in the English language. A retronym is a newer name for an existing subject, that differentiates the original form or version from a subsequent one. Retronyms are typically used as a self-explanatory adjective for a subject.

Retronymic adjectives
 Analog Describes non-digital devices:
 Analog clock: Before digital clocks, most clocks had faces and hands. See also: Analog watch.
 Analog drawing: Drawing with conventional tools on a paper or canvas, as opposed to drawing on a computer using a software
 Analog synthesizer: Before synthesizers contained microchips, every stage of the internal electronic signal flow was analogous to a sound that would eventually be produced at the output stage, and this sound was shaped and altered as it passed through each filter and envelope.
 Analog watch: Before the advent of the digital watch, all watches had faces and hands. After the advent of the digital watch, watches with faces and hands became known as analog watches.
 Analog recording
 Conventional, classic, or traditional Describes devices or methods that have been largely replaced or significantly supplemented by new ones. For example, conventional (non-microwave) oven, or conventional weapon (one which does not incorporate chemical, biological or nuclear payloads).
 Classic Doctor Who: Used to distinguish the original series of the classic show from the 21st century sequel, New Doctor Who. This retronym is used by the BBC when both of these shows air.
 Classic Leave It to Beaver: Used to distinguish the original series of the classic sitcom from the 1980s sequel, The New Leave It To Beaver. This retronym was used by TBS when both of these shows aired.
 Coca-Cola Classic: Originally called Coca-Cola, the name was changed when the original recipe was reintroduced after New Coke failed to catch on. This is an example of a retronym officially coined by a product's manufacturer.
 Conventional airplane: In the late 1940s and early 1950s, this term was used to distinguish piston-engined aircraft from the new jet types.
 Conventional landing gear: Term used to distinguish the traditional landing gear arrangement of two main wheels and a tail wheel (also referred to as the "tail-dragger" type) from the newer tricycle landing gear (two main wheels and a nose wheel).
 Conventional memory: term coined when MS-DOS and other operating systems for the IBM PC and other IBM-like x86 machines went over the 640k memory limit with tricks to access extra memory with different code to address it.
 iPod classic : Suffix added from its 6th generation. Referring to the original iPod model that still used a hard drive as opposed to the flash-based iPod shuffle and iPod nano, and a click wheel as opposed to the touch screen-based iPod touch.  
 Conventional oven: Before the development of the microwave oven, this term was not used. Now it is commonly found in cooking instructions for prepared foods.
 Conventional war: Before the development of nuclear weapons, this term was not used. (War, Gwynne Dyer)
 Traditional braces: Used to refer to braces that are metal and crafted by hand, as opposed to SureSmile, Invisalign, and other new technologies.
 "Traditional Chinese characters": Used to contrast with Simplified Chinese characters.
 Traditional animation: With the rise of computer animation, hand-drawn, cel-based (or "2D") animation is now referred to as this.
 Civilian Used to refer to items that are not of military quality or for military use, to differentiate them from the military version.
 First, I or 1, also part 1, version 1, etc., Senior,  the Elder Used when there is a second, third, fourth, etc. version/incarnation of something. This is not a retronym if it is used from the start in the anticipation of subsequent versions. When a dynastic ruler has or adopts the same name as a predecessor, the original is often retrospectively given the Roman numeral I if he did not already use one in his lifetime. For example, the Dutch prince William I of Orange was just William during his lifetime. On the other hand, e.g. emperor Franz Joseph I of Austria was so entitled even though there were no subsequent emperors of that name. In the United States, names (typically of males) may also follow this convention, or the father may be given the suffix Senior (Sr.), with Junior (Jr.) for the son; Roman numerals would be used if the name is repeated again. In some cases, such as US President George Bush and Major League Baseball player Ken Griffey, well-known people have become retroactively referred to as "Senior" after namesake sons rose to prominence in their own right. Also sometimes used to refer to the first incarnation of a movie, video game, etc. after sequels have been created, although such works are seldom renamed in this way officially. When Sony released the PlayStation 2, a redesigned version of the original PlayStation was also released under the name PSone. However, the word "One" doesn't always refer to version 1 of a product, such as in Xbox One.
 Manual Used to distinguish from automatic or electric versions.
 Manual transmissions in vehicles were just called "transmissions" until the invention of automatic transmissions. Sometimes they are called "standard" transmissions, but that adjective has become a misnomer in the United States since automatic transmissions have become the standard feature for most models today.
 Manual typewriters were likewise just called "typewriters" until the invention of electric typewriters.
 Natural Use to distinguish from artificial versions.
Natural dyes like woad, indigo, saffron and madder were simply "dyes" until synthetic dyes were developed in the mid-19th century.
Natural gums were just "gums" until synthetic gums were invented.
Natural languages are those which evolved naturally in humans through use and repetition without conscious planning or premeditation, as opposed to recently developed constructed languages and formal languages.
Natural ropes or plant ropes, such as those made from hemp or sisal, were just "ropes" until ropes made of synthetic materials became common.
 Natural satellites were just called "satellites" until the launch of Sputnik 1.
Natural skin care involves the use of topical creams and lotions made of ingredients available in nature; all skin care was natural until synthetic cosmetics were invented.
Natural sponge: all sponges were natural (either made from Luffa aegyptiaca or animal sponges) until polyester and polyurethane sponges came on the market in the mid-20th century.
Natural rubber or India rubber was simply called "rubber" until synthetic rubber was invented in 1909.
 Old
 Naturally used when there is officially a "new" version of anything, to refer to the previous version. For example, when British money was decimalized and the new penny of 1/100 pound was adopted, the previous penny of 1/240 pound became known as the old penny.
 Old-fashioned refers to any practice which is no longer customary, e.g. in the context of dress sense, hairstyle or wording, as opposed to (the) fashion, which refers to anything which is at present customary. In popular music and the wider popular culture, the term old school (originally only used in hip-hop, but now in many other genres) has developed a similar meaning, and this has spread to other areas as well.
 Offline Computer users will sometimes agree to meet offline, i.e. face to face in the real world, as opposed to online in an Internet-based chat room or other such means of electronic communication. Before the Internet became widely used, this was of course the only way to "meet" someone and the term to meet offline was unheard of. Stephen Colbert, on his 4 February 2016 broadcast of The Late Show with Stephen Colbert, remarked on the strangeness of so-called "offline shopping", regarding Amazon.com's retail bookstore endeavor.
 Real Often used in a derogatory manner to signify that the original product is the "real" product, as if the new alternative is "fake". For example, "Real instruments" for instruments other than the synth; "Real car" for a fuel-burning car, as opposed to an electric car.
 Regular or plain Used to refer to an original product after new versions are released. For example, one could formerly just ask for a Pepsi. But with the advent of multiple versions like Diet Pepsi and Pepsi Max, one might ask for a regular Pepsi when one wants the original drink. Similarly, regular Oreo cookies were called that after Double Stuf Oreos and other varieties were released. Another example is that in the United States regular gasoline (petrol or petroleum spirit outside the U.S.) has now come to mean 87 octane-rated unleaded (ratings in other countries vary). In the United States almost all gasoline had tetraethyl lead additive and was sold as either regular gasoline (octane rating of 89) or high test (octane ratings of 91 or higher) until leaded petrol was phased out starting in the late 1970s; all new cars made since 1975 have catalytic converters.
 Plain M&M's: Plain M&M's candies (now Milk Chocolate) would not have been called that until 1954, when Peanut M&M's were introduced.
 Plain old telephone service (POTS): The term refers to the telephone service still available after the advent of more advanced forms of telephony, such as ISDN, mobile phones, and VoIP
 Plain text: Before word processing programs for computers with functions such as support for multiple fonts, underlining, bold/italic and other function came along, text files were simply just known as text. "Plain text" is also used in contrast to ciphered text.
 Regular cab pickup truck (also called single cab) used when extended and crew/double cabs became widely available.
 Regular coffee: The development of decaffeinated coffee led to this coinage.
 Regular / Normal cigarette : A tobacco cigarette. Before electronic cigarettes became popular, all commercially available cigarettes were tobacco cigarettes. Along the same lines, the smoking of traditional cigarettes is sometimes referred to as “traditional smoking” in order to distinguish it from vaping, which could also be considered a form of smoking.
Tabletop Used to describe the original version of a board game or role-playing game once a video game version has been released. Tabletop can also refer to non-digital games in general in order to contrast them from video games.
 Vanilla Used to describe an unaltered, plain version of an item, often in reference to software. For example, in computer games with expansion packs, it is used to distinguish the original version from subsequent versions, especially when the original game does not have a subtitle. For example, World of Warcraft could refer to either the original game or one of the expansion packs, so users may refer to the original as "vanilla" to distinguish it from the subsequent versions.
 Wired Wired or hardwired refer to products such as telephones, headphones, speakers, computer accessories, etc., which are now available in wireless versions. Wireless telegraphy and wireless telephony were some of the first applications of radio technology, in the 1910s and 1920s; "wireless" as a noun today is sometimes simply a synonym for "mobile phone service"/"cell phone service".

Nouns

Numbers
1994 Level  Before the Doom engine had more features added in source ports such as Boom ZDoom and Doom Legacy, all levels for Doom made around 1994 had limitations that constrained the gaming atmosphere.  But when more features were added to source ports for better level atmospheres, older-style levels started to be called "1994 levels" to differentiate from the newer kind.
2D  With the increasing prevalence of 3-D movies, conventional, non-stereoscopic versions of movies are starting to be called 2D versions.  This is also used in reference to animation, to distinguish the older style hand-drawn or more recently vector-based animation from 3D-rendered animation.

A–B
Acoustic guitar  Before the invention of the solid-body electric guitar, all guitars amplified the sound of a plucked string with a resonating hollow body. Similarly: acoustic piano.
American Morse Code  This was the original signaling alphabet, suggested by Samuel Morse's assistant, Alfred Vail. It has a variety of different units and timings. It was later replaced by the Continental code (also called international Morse code), which has simpler timings and a different alphabet. Also called "railroad code".
AM radio Before the introduction of broadcast FM radio, the AM broadcast band radio was known simply as radio, wireless (in the UK) or as medium-wave radio (still the preferred term among radio enthusiasts) to distinguish it from the (also amplitude-modulated) shortwave radio bands.
AM(/FM) only radio Before FM radio receivers came to the market, AM receivers were simply just known as radios.  However, as AM/FM radios started to include turntables, tape players, CD players, and later on analog AUX inputs, satellite radio and even USB, AM/FM radios without bells and whistles would start to be called AM/FM-only radios on their own.
Animal Crossing: Population: Growing!  Used to refer to the original GameCube game after the release of its sequels. The name comes from its tagline in English-speaking regions.
 Apple I  Originally released as the Apple Computer, it was renamed after the introduction of the Apple II personal computer.
 Artistic gymnastics  Generally known simply as gymnastics before Rhythmic gymnastics was added to the Olympic program in 1984.
 At-grade expressway  Since freeways are divided highways with 100% grade separations, expressways are at-grade highways with no direct private access.  Some jurisdictions have different criteria on the difference of word use, but sometimes they are used interchangeably in areas that don't have many at-grade expressways.  Since expressway and freeway are sometimes used interchangeably, the term at-grade expressway has been coined since there was a time when all expressways were at-grade; prior to the 1940s which is when California and Michigan planned out the nation's first freeways.  States like Florida sometimes use the term "freeway" in reference to expressways (at-grade or grade-separated) which are free-of-charge to use.
 Atari 2600  Originally sold as the Atari Video Computer System (or Atari VCS for short). When its successor, the Atari 5200, was released, the VCS was rebranded the Atari 2600, after its part number (CX-2600).
 Bar soap  The common cake of soap used in the tub or shower was familiarly called "soap" or "bath soap"; the term "bar soap" arose with the advent of soaps in liquid and gel form.
 Black Licorice  In North America, licorice is often called "black licorice" to distinguish it from similar confectionery varieties that are not flavored with licorice extract, and commonly manufactured in the form of chewy ropes or tubes.
 Black powder  Called "gunpowder" for centuries while it was in common use.  The retronym "black powder" was coined in the late 19th century to differentiate it from the newly developed smokeless powder which superseded it.
 Black-and-white television  Once called simply television, now the retronym is used to distinguish it from color television, which is now more commonly referred to by the unadorned term.  Along the same lines: broadcast television, free-to-air television, over-the-air television, silent movie. Furthermore, "Standard Definition Television" has become necessary to distinguish sets from HDTV (high definition).
 Boeing 737 Classic  When Boeing introduced the 737 Next Generation (-600, -700, -800, and -900 series), the -300, -400, and -500 variants of the Boeing 737 still in service were called the 737 Classic.
 Boeing 737 Original  The 737-100 and -200 were known simply as the "Boeing 737" at first; when the 737 Next Generation was introduced, and the 737-300, -400, and -500 were retrospectively designated as the 737 Classic, the 737-100 and -200 became known as the 737 Original to distinguish these even-older airplanes from the Classics.
 Breadbin C64  When Commodore introduced the C64C, which had a redesigned case, the original C64 model was nicknamed the breadbin to differentiate it.
 Brick-and-mortar school   A school that has a street address and building as opposed to an online school, which may have a main office building, but students can be located in a different locale than the teachers. The internet is used as a conduit for information exchanges, both synchronously and asynchronously. 
 Brick-and-mortar store, high street shop  As increasing use of the Internet allowed online stores, accessible only through computers, to compete with established retail shops, the latter began to be called "brick-and-mortar stores" or "high street shops" to indicate that customers could (or had to) visit them to examine and purchase their goods. These two terms are also often used to describe the physical storefronts of a retail business that also sells products online. In the U.S. and Canada, "brick-and-mortar" emphasizes the physical construction of these stores, as opposed to the largely electronic nature of online stores. The terms "high street shop" (UK) or "main street store" or "downtown store" (U.S. and Canada) also serve to differentiate the more traditional retail venue from big-chain "box stores" such as K-mart, Wal-Mart, or Zellers, which did not exist prior to the 1960s. (The name "High Street" is commonly used in the UK for a town's primary thoroughfare. In the U.S. and Canada, it is more likely to be called "Main Street".)
 British English   Was simply referred to as "English" until North American English dialects and British English dialects started to diverge.
 Broadcast television  This term was coined in the U.S. to distinguish it from cable and satellite television.
 Brown rice  Prior to the mid nineteenth century, all rice consumed was brown or, whole grain. With the invention of white rice, brown began to refer to the traditional version.

C–E
 Chicago II  Refers to the second album by the band Chicago. The album was originally entitled just Chicago but the name was changed after the release of the third album, Chicago III. (Their first album was called Chicago Transit Authority, as that was the name of the band at the time.)
 Classical Hollywood Cinema  a term commonly used since the 1970s to refer to the mainstream commercial American cinema of roughly 1930–1960, which at the time was simply referred to as "Hollywood", "the cinema", "the movies" etc. (see 'film noir' below).
 Classic Apple  After Apple bought NeXT in 1997 and later became profitable, people began to refer to the pre-1997 history of the company as Classic Apple to differentiate it from the post-1997 Apple as the company was near bankruptcy when it bought NeXT. Apple nowadays is very successful and popular.
 Classic rock  a radio format referring to blues rock and hard rock music from the 1960s to the 1990s. The radio format previously was known as Album-oriented rock.
 Classic Mac OS  Originally called System and later Mac OS, Apple retroactively added Classic to versions of the operating system from 1 to 9.2.2 (which were partly based on Lisa OS) to differentiate them from the newer Mac OS X (which was based on NeXTSTEP).
 Cloth diaper (Terry nappy)  Before the second half of the 20th century, all diapers (nappies, in the UK) were made from cloth (terry cloth) and simply called diapers (US) or nappies (UK). The advent of the disposable diaper gave rise to this term.
 Command & Conquer: Tiberian Dawn  This name is sometimes used by fans of the Command & Conquer series to refer to the original game of the series, officially known simply as Command & Conquer.
 Complex instruction set computer This name was coined after the advent of Reduced instruction set computer.
 Constitution Act, 1867 Prior to 1982, when the patriation of the constitution occurred, Canada's constitution was known as British North America Act 1867.
 Corn on the cob  Before canned corn was widely available, "corn on the cob" was simply "corn".
 Bic Cristal  Before the 2000s, the Bic Cristal was named "Bic Classic" pen. Prior to the 1990s, "Bic Classic" was referred to simply as the "Bic pen".
 CSI: Las Vegas  Not used before the debut of the spinoff series CSI: Miami in 2002, and CSI: NY in 2004.
Curved, curly or smart quotes  Straight quotes were made widespread by typewriters.  The smart designation came about as word processing software would often change straight quotes into curved quotes. 
 Data-transfer USB port  Before "recharge-only" (or powered USB) came along, all USB ports could both transfer data, and "recharge" mobile devices.
 Day baseball  Baseball played during the day, as all games were played before electric lighting in stadiums became common.
 Dairy milk  Used to refer to actual milk from a mammal's mammary glands, as opposed to plant milks like soy milk, rice milk, almond milk, and coconut milk.
 Disposable battery  Before rechargeable batteries became popular in AA, AAA, C, D and PP3 form factors, all batteries in those form factors were disposable. However, rechargeable batteries back then were limited to stationary and vehicular (sometimes semi-portable) applications.
 Divided expressway/freeway (USA)  Early expressways and freeways were divided corridors, but recent concepts of freeways and expressways have included occasional undivided corridors for economic and environmental compromises, as well as an initial phase prior to twinning.  But it is unclear whether undivided versions existed first.  However, the expressway, parkway and freeway concepts were developed with divided highways in mind during the 1910s (parkways) and 1940s (freeways), the German Autobahn would be conceptualized around the same time with similar qualities to freeways.
 Dumb Phone  A phone with either no or limited internet capabilities. These phones also have no or limited ability to run apps. Before smartphones became popular, these were simply considered ‘phones’ or ‘cellphones’. They are also sometimes referred to as feature phones or “flip phones”.
 Electric guitar
 English muffin Originally called a 'muffin' in southern England, the prefix is now used to distinguish them from the American version.

F–H
 Face-to-face conference  A conference whose participants meet in the same room, as opposed to using telephones or video cameras (similarly:IRL-meeting = in-real-life meeting).
 Farmall Regular As explained at Farmall tractor, the name Farmall began as a model name but became a sub-brand name as additional models were developed.
 Fat model  In the console collecting scene, a "Fat model" represents consoles released before a model that is more compact and has different hardware specifications. 
 Field hockey (North America)  Known simply as "hockey" (as it still is in the UK and Ireland) until ice hockey and roller hockey became popular. (In addition, there is a game called street hockey, which evolved from ice hockey.) Similarly, Field soccer (Football) and Field lacrosse (lacrosse). (Both North America)
 Film camera As opposed to digital camera. Also, the use of a film camera is often referred to as “film photography”, “analogue photography”, or “traditional photography” in order to distinguish it from digital photography.
 Film noir  Prior to the 1970s, films with "film noir" style were referred to in English-speaking countries simply as dramas or melodramas (see 'Classical Hollywood' above).  The term was coined in the 1950s by French critics who were taking the products of Hollywood more seriously than critics in the English-speaking world tended to at the time.
 First Gundam A nickname, commonly used by Japanese fans of the franchise and coined shortly after the release of Zeta Gundam. Gundam 0079 is also used in the same fashion.
 First Anglo-Dutch War  Renamed after the Second Anglo-Dutch War in 1664.
 Fixedsys  The monospaced system font in Microsoft Windows 1.x and 2.x, simply called System under those systems.  In Windows 3.0, System became a proportional font, and the original font was renamed Fixedsys. 
 Fortnite: Save the World  Originally titled Fortnite, it was renamed after the release of Fortnite: Battle Royale.
 Forward slash  Before the introduction of ASCII and electronic keyboards for computers, typewriters had only one type of slash ("/"), normally produced by the unshifted key shared with the question mark. The rise of MS-DOS brought regular use of the backslash ("\") character found on computer keyboards (for specifying directory paths). Before that time the symbol "/" was known simply as a "slash" (US) or "oblique" (UK). (Other typographical names for this character are virgule and solidus. In the UK, the character was traditionally known as an oblique stroke or, more simply, an oblique. To slash means to cut with a scything motion, which is analogous to the motion of the pen as the character is handwritten.)
 Free-range parenting  Traditionally children had less supervision prior to the 21st century; this allowed for more independence and freedom in a child's decision making. There is a modern term called helicopter parenting which refers to parents who overly monitor, plan, and get involved with their kids activities.
 French franc  The currency unit of France before the euro, which was originally the only franc, but had to be distinguished from the Belgian franc, Communauté Financière Africaine franc, and Swiss franc after those countries adopted the term.
 Friction brake  Automotive disc brake or drum brake.  Coined after the advent of the regenerative brake in electric or hybrid automobiles.
 Frizzen  This component was called the "hammer" while flintlock firearms were in use.  On percussion cap firearms which replaced flintlock the striking component was called the hammer and the term frizzen was applied to the hammer of flintlocks.
 Full service  A radio format that consists of a wide range of programming. Coined after the introduction of contemporary hit radio in the 1950s.
 Full-size van (US)  Coined after the introduction of minivans by the Big Three automakers, although box trucks (bigger vehicles that were considered vans) existed prior to the Big Three's use of full-size van.
 Game Boy Classic  Used to distinguish the original from the Game Boy Pocket, the Game Boy Color, and the Game Boy Advance.
 Game Boy Mono  see Game Boy Classic. Refers to the monochrome graphics these models produced.
 GM "old-look" transit bus  The GM old look did not originally have a name, but in 1959, a new design was released and was called the new look. After this many people started calling the older design the Old Look.
 Ground warfare  The "Ground war" term/phrase developed some time after the widespread adoption of large scale use of aircraft as a viable weapon of war.
 Hand-barrow Originally, "barrows" suspended the load on poles carried by two people, one in front and one behind.  "Wheelbarrows" are first cited by the Oxford English Dictionary to the 14th century, and in the 15th century the term hand-barrow arose to refer to the older sort of barrow, but in the British Isles the more common version was sedan chair (if a person was being carried).
 Hand grenade  All grenades were hand-thrown until the invention of the rifle grenade, and, later, the grenade launcher.
 Handwritten  Crops up in the late 19th century to contrast with "typewritten". 
 Hard cider  In Europe and Asia, "cider" refers to fermented (alcoholic) apple juice. In the U.S., "cider" or "apple cider" often refers to unfiltered non-alcoholic apple juice. "Hard cider" specifies the alcoholic version.
 Hardcover book  Prior to the invention of paperbacks, all books were hardcover and simply referred to as "books".
 Hard disk  All disks were hard (i.e. constructed of rigid instead of flexible magnetic material) until the advent of the floppy disk.
 High-floorAll buses and trams were high-floor until the advent of low-floor trams and low-floor and low-entry buses.
 Horse cavalry  Used to distinguish the now mostly obsolete original use of horses in a military mounted combat role, with the advent of tanks and other motorized vehicles (mechanized cavalry or armored cavalry) following World War I, and the use of helicopters (air cavalry) during the Vietnam War era.
 Horsecar (Horse Tram in English speaking countries outside North America)  Used to describe the horse-pulled predecessor of the modern streetcar / tram. Originally called 'street cars' or just 'cars'. After street railway companies started electrifying their systems around 1900, the term became 'electric street cars' or 'electric trams', to differentiate from the previous horse-drawn vehicles. As time went on the word 'electric' was dropped, and as automobiles began being referred to as cars, the term 'streetcar'(US) or 'tram'(UK) remained to describe a public transit vehicle that ran on rails at street level
 Hot chocolate  In the days before the invention of sweet solid chocolate for eating, the word "chocolate" was usually used to refer to the drink. For a while after the chocolate bar was invented it was referred to as "bar chocolate", but due to its rise in popularity in the latter half of the 19th century it eventually laid claim to the basic word.
 Human computer  Until mechanical computers, and later electronic computers became commercially available, the term "computer", in use from the mid-17th century, meant "one who computes": a person performing mathematical calculations. Teams of people were frequently used to undertake long and often tedious calculations; the work was sometimes divided so that this could be done in parallel.

I–L
 Indoor volleyball  Used to differentiate from beach volleyball after the latter gained prominence.
 Independent bookstore  All bookstores were independent until the advent of bookstore chains.
 Inground pool  A swimming pool where the filled high water level is flush with the ground; compared to above an "above ground pool" where the entire pool is above ground level
 id Tech 1 engine  A name applied to the Doom engine. Later game engines by id Software used the "id Tech" nomenclature, beginning with id Tech 4.
 iBook G3  Originally sold as the iBook, these machines were renamed the iBook G3 after the release of the iBook G4.
 iBook Clamshell : Originally sold as the iBook, the machine was nicknamed the Clamshell after Apple released the iBook G3 Snow.
 iBook G3 Snow : Just like its predecessor, the machine was originally sold as the iBook before being nicknamed the iMac G3 Snow by Apple so the name could be used on the iBook G4.
 iMac
 iMac G3 : Originally sold as the iMac, the machine was renamed the iMac G3 by Apple so the name could be used on the iMac G4.
 iMac G4 : Just like its predecessor, the machine was originally sold as the iMac before being renamed the iMac G4 by Apple so the name could be used on the iMac G5.
 iMac G5 : Just like its predecessors, the machine was originally sold as the iMac before being renamed the iMac G5 by Apple so the name could be used on the Intel-based iMac.
 iPhone 2G  Used to differentiate the original 2007 model of the iPhone from its later models.
 King's Quest: Quest for the Crown  The 1983 game was originally titled King's Quest until the fifth rerelease in 1987 when the subtitle was added to the box art, instructions, and all other materials. This was done to prevent confusion with the sequels which were already on the market.
 Landline phone service  With the advent of cellular or mobile phone services, traditional hard-wired phone service became popularly known as landline phones.  Previously, this term was generally only used by military personnel and amateur radio operators. (In the movie The Matrix a landline phone was also referred to as a "hardline".) Even though a considerable amount of landline phone traffic is transmitted via airwaves, this term comes from the physical cabling that provides the "last mile" connection between the customer premises and local phone distribution centers.  Because of the communications industry's love for acronyms, landline phone service has also been called POTS—Plain Old Telephone Service. The logical complement of this acronym, "PANS" became a backronym for "Pretty Amazing New Services".  In the telecommunications industry the term wireline is used for landline phone services, to distinguish them from wireless or mobile phone services. Wireline is clearly another retronym.
 Lead-acid car battery  Before other battery chemical substances such as Ni-MH and Li-Ion were employed in hybrid and electric vehicles (although some current hybrid cars used lead-acid and some high-end conventional gasoline vehicles use Li-ion), lead-acid batteries were the only batteries for automobiles on the market; and they were also the only rechargeable ones on the market.
 LED mouse  Before laser mice came along, all optical mice employed LEDs.
 Led Zeppelin I  Led Zeppelin's first album was the self-titled Led Zeppelin; it is sometimes called Led Zeppelin I because their subsequent albums were called Led Zeppelin II and Led Zeppelin III.
 Linear momentum  Before the concept of angular momentum was developed, the only type of momentum known was linear.
 Linear television  Before the rise of video on demand, video hosting services, streaming media, and digital video recorders, the only way to consume television was through watching television channels, on broadcast, cable or satellite, which showed a combination of both live and recorded programming at designated times. 
Lithium primary battery  Batteries involving lithium were all primary cells (disposable) before rechargeable lithium-based batteries such as lithium ion batteries (later lithium polymer battery) hit the market.
Live action  A form of a film that consists of images consisting of predominantly actual actors and objects that exist in the actual world, as opposed to an animated film, which predominantly consists of artificial static images or objects that take advantage of the persistence of vision principle of film to give an illusion of life.
 Live poker  What casinos call the kind of poker played with cards by people sitting at a table; what many others still just call "poker"; also called a "ring game" or "cash game". The term became necessary to distinguish it from video poker, which is far more common in casinos today.
 Live music  Before the publication of recorded music, all music was live.
 Live band dance Before the advent of DJs (and then automated playlists), all dances had live music.
 Low-beam headlights  simply just headlights before high beams were introduced on motor vehicles.
 Luggable computer  The first generation of computers marketed as "portable", such as the Kaypro or the Osborne series, were quite bulky and were heavier than a bowling ball. The weight was mostly because they had a conventional CRT-type monitor built in. When the first laptop computers came out, the earlier, heavier portable machines became referred to as "luggables".

M–P
 Macintosh 128k  Originally named the Macintosh, changed to distinguish from the Macintosh 512k.
 Madden 89, 90, 91  Respectively known as 1988 video game, 1990 video game, and John Madden Football II, this was in the early days before year numbers were added to the title of Madden NFL video games.
 Mainframe computer  When minicomputers (which were the size and shape of a desk or credenza) were introduced in the early 1970s, existing systems that often consisted of multiple large racks of equipment received the name "mainframe", alluding to the vertical cabinets or "frames" in which they were installed.
 Manual transmission (also standard transmission)  Automotive transmissions were all manual before the invention of the automatic transmission.
 Meatspace or "meat life" or "real life"  All of physical reality, as distinguished from cyberspace.
 Mechanical disk  Before the advent of solid-state ram, and later solid-state flash memory (i.e. no moving parts), all computer disks had moving parts, hence the "mechanical" adjective.  These include hard disks, floppy disks, and optical disks (CD-ROMs and DVD-ROMs).
 Mechanical fuel injection  The amount of fuel squirted into an internal combustion engine by a fuel injection system was, before integrated circuitry became applied to motor vehicle engines, originally regulated by a calibrated mechanical linkage. What made for the retronym was the more precise Electronic Fuel Injection, which employed more sensors.
 Mechanical mouse  before the optical mouse was introduced, all computer mice had a mechanical ball.
 Mechanical watch  Prior to the introduction of the first quartz movement watches in the late 1960s, all watches used a mechanical movement.
 Microsoft Edge Legacy   Referring to its first iteration that used Microsoft’s proprietary EdgeHTML engine, from the Chromium-based counterpart that was released in December 2018.  
 Middle Ages  The period in European history from the 5th to the 15th century A. D. The earliest use of the term Middle Ages is recorded in 1604, to differentiate that period from the era of Antiquity and the then-beginning age of Modernity.
 Minecraft: Java Edition  The original release of the game, on Microsoft Windows, was simply known as Minecraft prior to the release of Minecraft: Windows 10 Edition. In addition, other versions of the video game on Microsoft Windows are Minecraft Classic, Minecraft 4k, and Minecraft: Education Edition.
 Monaural sound, monophonic sound or mono sound  Often simplified to simply "mono". Before stereo sound was introduced, mono sound was simply just called sound.
 Muzzleloader  For centuries virtually all firearms were loaded from the muzzle, so there was no need for a term to distinguish this characteristic until the general adoption of breech-loading firearms in the 19th century.
 Narrow-body aircraft  An aircraft arranged along a single aisle permitting up to 6-abreast seating in a cabin below  of width. Before the arrival of wide-body aircraft in the early 1970s, narrow-body aircraft was simply just called aircraft.
 Natural language  A language, used by humans, that evolved naturally in its society. Contrast with computer programming languages or constructed languages. Often referred to as human language.
 Natural person To distinguish humans (the original "persons") from the legal fiction of "juridical persons", non-human entities treated like people in law.
 Naturally aspirated engines  Internal combustion engines that use vacuum and venturi effect to draw the air and fuel mixture into the cylinders, without fuel injection, turbo-charger, or supercharger.
 oil lamp Before the invention of kerosene lamps and electric lamps in the 19th century, all lamps were oil lamps.
 Old Nintendo 3DS  Used to refer to the original models of the Nintendo 3DS before the release of the New Nintendo 3DS in 2014.
 Old Labour  Term used in the 1990s and 2000s to refer to the policies the UK Labour Party was perceived to have held before Tony Blair's leadership, policies previously referred to simply as "Labour".
 Old Look A type of transit bus, which gained this name after the introduction of the New Look bus. Both were made by GM
 Old Testament In the Jewish tradition, the Hebrew Bible is known as the Tanakh.
 Open captions  After the introduction of closed caption decoders in the early 1980's and before decoder chips in TV sets became standard in the mid-1990's, TV stations would occasionally add captions to broadcasts which were visible to everyone and could not be turned off, as was done in the 1970's.
 Open sewer  Before enclosed pipes, or underground corridors for sewers came along, all sewers were open.  For instance, the open sewers in the Middle Ages was largely responsible for The Black Death.
 Optical zoom  The advent of digital cameras (and accompanying digital zoom) necessitated this retronym, describing the "analog" method of achieving close-up using a zoom lens.
 Opposite-sex marriage  coined after the advent of same-sex marriage.
 Organic farming, organic food  Farming practiced without the use of artificial fertilizers, pesticides, and so forth; and the food so produced.
 Over-the-board chess (also OTB chess)  Chess played in real time using a physical chessboard, as opposed to computer chess or correspondence chess.

 Overground train Used in the UK to refer to trains that run above ground throughout, as opposed to Underground trains which only run partly overground. (The key distinction is that "Overground" trains are not fully integrated into the Underground system.)
 Paid-for sales, pure sales since the introduction of streaming into chart compilation, with (as in the UK Singles Chart) a certain number of streams often being added together to make a streaming sale, traditional sales of music (whether in physical or digital format) are now often referred to by these terms.
Pai Gow tiles   Before pai gow poker was created in 1985, the original game with dominoes was simply called pai gow. Pai gow poker is significantly more popular than pai gow played with dominoes so this qualifier is used.
Paleoconservative  Before the advent of the neoconservative movement in the 1970s and its breakthrough success in the 1990s, American conservatism was largely defined by what would be referred to in the 2000s (decade) as paleoconservatism.
Pararescue jumper  The term Pararescue jumper is a retronym of the initials "PJ", which were used on Air Force Form 5 (Aircrew Flight Log) to identify anyone on board in order to jump from the aircraft. Pararescuemen originally had no "in flight" duties, and were listed only as "PJ" on the Form 5. The Pararescue position eventually grew to include duties as an aerial gunner and scanner on rotary wing aircraft, a duty now performed by aerial gunners. Currently, aircrew qualified Pararescuemen are recorded using aircrew position identifier "J" ("Pararescue Member") on AFTO form 781.
Paper book E-books being commoner by the day, it is now necessary to distinguish books printed on paper from books distributed in a digital form.
Paper copy, hard copy  With the proliferation of exchange of documents in the form of electronic files, physical copies of documents acquired this retronym. Occasionally extended to the copying devices; i.e. paper copiers. The jocular substitute dead-tree copy is sometimes used.
 Parallel ATA (PATA)  The original ATA interface was parallel; the qualification became necessary when Serial ATA was introduced.
 Peanut butter  Prior to the invention of homogenized peanut butter in the 1920s, all peanut butter was old fashioned or natural, the oil separated and the product required stirring before use. In addition, all peanut butter was creamy or smooth prior to invention of crunchy or chunky peanut butter in the 1920s.
 Permanent magnet  Used for an object that is permanently magnetized rather than an electromagnet.
 Physical media (data transfer)  Refers to the transmission of data over wires, such as copper cables, fibre optic or coaxial cable, as opposed to wireless communication.
 Physical media (media storage)  Refers to the storage of data on physical objects, such as paper, photographs, video tapes, or optical disks, as opposed to cloud storage or streaming media.
 Physical single  After the coming of the legal music download, this term became commonplace to refer to a vinyl, CD or cassette single, which would previously have been referred to simply as a "single".
 Pickup truck  Before SUVs (often referred to as "trucks") were introduced, pickup trucks were those on a sturdy frame with high ground clearance. The term SUV was not coined in the 1990s; prior to then, SUVs were referred to as "trucks" and sometimes "cars".
 Pipe organ  Before smaller reed-based organs and harmoniums were invented, every organ used large pipes.
 PlayStation 1 or PS1 to distinguish from the PlayStation 2 and its subsequent successors (PS3 and PS4). A smaller version of the original PlayStation was named the PS one, released shortly after the PS2.
 PowerPC G1  Originally called the PowerPC 601, the processor was nicknamed the G1 after Apple used the G3, G4, and the G5 names to refer to the PowerPC 7xx, PowerPC 74xx, and PowerPC 970 respectively.
 PowerPC G2  Originally called the PowerPC 603, the processor was nicknamed the G2 after Apple used the G3, G4, and the G5 names to refer to the PowerPC 7xx, PowerPC 74xx, and PowerPC 970 respectively.
 Primordial element and Transient element  Elements that are found in nature, as opposed to those that have to be created in the lab using a collider.
 Post sedan or post coupe  In the United States this indicates a car with a full-height B-pillar, as opposed to a pillarless (half-height B-pillar) hardtop. Generally used only in referring to classic cars from the 1950 to 1980 period because fashion and safety regulations dictate nearly all modern cars are post models.
 Pragmaticism  In 1905, in order to differentiate his original version from more recent forms of Pragmatism, Charles Sanders Peirce renamed his version to Pragmaticism, a term "ugly enough to be safe from kidnappers".
 Pre-dreadnought battleship  The revolution in battleship design brought about by the construction of HMS Dreadnought resulted in almost all the battleships built before her completion becoming known as "pre-Dreadnought battleships", whereas before they had simply been "battleships".
 Premoji/pre-emoji or Premoticon/pre-emoticon  The use of specifically ordered sets of ASCII characters in 
 typographic approximation that conveyed imagery and eventually lead to emoji being included in Unicode. In many applications, premoji sequences will trigger a text-predict image of the emoji character.  
 Primary cell Also, less formally non-rechargeable battery; Before the introduction of rechargeable batteries, all cells were primary, then when rechargeable batteries came along (lead-acid battery being the first), rechargeable batteries would formally be called "secondary cells".
 Prime lens A camera lens with a fixed focal length (e.g. 28 mm), as opposed to a zoom lens, which can cover a range of focal lengths (e.g. 28–105 mm).  Before the invention of zoom lenses, all camera lenses had a fixed focal length, so they were just called "lenses".
 Procedural programming Before object-oriented programming was invented in the 1980s, there was just programming.
 Program Files (x86) Before x86-64 versions of Microsoft Windows were released, all Windows applications since Windows 95 were installed in the directory back when it was simply just C:\Program Files.
 Prop airplane  As jet aircraft became the primary people movers of the airways, the older propeller-based technology received this occasional shorthand nickname to distinguish it.
 Pulse dialing  After touch tone dialing on telephones became common, the older dialing standard became known as pulse dialing.

R–Z
 Raw milk  also called fresh milk, refers to milk that has not been pasteurized, a process which did not become standard until the 1800s
 Real numbers  coined after the development of the imaginary numbers.
 Real mode  before protected mode had been introduced in the 80286 processor, the term "real mode" was not in use for MS-DOS memory management.
 Real tennis  was once known simply as tennis, but came into use at the end of the 19th century to distinguish it from the game of lawn tennis patented in 1874.  The term "real tennis" has become more vague now since video game tennis has come along.  Therefore, real tennis is now court tennis.
 Red Book audio CD  At first, all audio CDs complied with the Red Book standard.  Then came other implementations of the audio CD, such as Super Audio CD, MP3 CDs, and DVD-Audio, and the original is now referred to as Red Book audio to differentiate between different standards.
 Red panda or lesser panda
 Were known as pandas in the English language, prior to the discovery and naming of the Giant Panda on the year 1869.

 Reel-to-reel or open reel  Tape recorders were originally simply tape recorders, as they all used a pair of open reels to hold the magnetic recording medium. The term reel-to-reel was introduced when various forms of cassette tape formats became popular.
 Reflective liquid crystal display  before LCDs had backlighting, all LCDs required the reflection of room light or sunlight in order to see the screen.
 Regular Nintendo  a colloquial nickname for the original Nintendo Entertainment System (NES) coined when Super Nintendo Entertainment System (Super NES) was introduced to the market.
 Roller skates  The term applied to all types of skates, though with the popularization of "rollerblades" during the 1990s, the term roller skates started to refer to older two axle template.
 Rotary telephone or dial telephone  The kind of telephone in common use before touch-tone telephones.
 Rugby union  To differentiate it from its descendant, rugby league. Like hockey, the original term of rugby is still widespread.
 Scalar processors  As opposed to Vector processors.
 Scripted series  Created in the wake of the success of reality television, the term applies to both fiction and non-fiction television with an identified writer or writers. The term can be misleading since reality television is almost never wholly improvised and often includes writing of some kind.
 Seventy-eight (78) rpm records  Before the advent of  rpm and 45 rpm vinyl records, these were known simply as records, phonograph records or gramophone records.
 short file name  (officially referred to as 8.3 filename) before the advent of long filenames.  FAT file systems only had 11 characters, three of which form the extension.  The ISO 9660 filesystem for CD-ROMs has similar specifications to conform to the FAT specs.
 Shovel Knight: Shovel of Hope  Refers to the 2014 video game originally known as Shovel Knight. For the game's 2017 Nintendo Switch release, the game was given the subtitle to make it more consistent with its included DLC campaigns. The overall package was renamed to Shovel Knight: Treasure Trove.
 Silent film  In the earliest days of the film industry, all films were without recorded sound. Once "talkies" became the norm, it became necessary to specify that a particular film was "silent".  The term "silent film" is also a misnomer, because silent films were typically presented in theatres with live musical accompaniment.
 Sit-down restaurant  With the rise of fast-food and take-out restaurants, the "standard" restaurant received a new name in the United States. (In the United Kingdom, fast food and takeaway (takeout) outlets are not normally referred to as "restaurants", so the "sit-down" qualifier is not necessary.)
 Smart Fortwo  Originally sold as the Smart City-Coupé, the car was renamed the Fortwo upon the release of the Smart Forfour.
 Snail mail (also known as land mail, paper mail, p-mail, and postal mail)  Non-electronic mail delivered to physical locations, such as one's home or business. Before email and voice mail, all mail was physical, and much slower by comparison – thus, the dysphemistic "snail" appellation. Compare surface mail, below.
Sneakernet Before the Internet became popular, the so-called "sneakernet" was simply just a regular transfer of computer data on physical, interchangeable media.  For instance, punched tape was used for this purpose at first, then floppy disks, then sneakernet was coined when the Internet became popular, now modern sneakernets involve transfer of Secure digital cards, USB flash drives, external hard drives, optical disks (CDs, DVDs, Blu-rays), etc.
Snow skiing Water skiing now necessitates this differentiation. This, however, only applies to an area where both "snow" as well as "water" skiing are likely. "Snow skiing" would not be mentioned in the Alpine regions, unless large lakes offered the availability of water skiing.
 Solid-propellant rocket Refers to rockets that use a solid propellant such as gunpowder or RDX; liquid-propellant rockets were invented in the mid-20th century. 
 Solo motorcycle  So called instead of motorcycle when some were being built with a sidecar. (see disputed retronyms below for more info).
 Sourdough Before other approaches to leavening bread were used, all bread dough was at least partially "sour".
 Special relativity  Term introduced after Einstein developed general relativity.
 standard AUX input (standard auxiliary input)  The common name for AUX audio inputs that doesn't employ an iPod dock connector, USB, optical/coaxial S/PDIF digital audio or proprietary mechanical standards that employ multiple standards alongside proprietary audio signaling standards.  It usually refers to 1/8th inch TRS connectors, but sometimes it can refer to a set of red and white RCA stereo jacks.
 Star Trek: The Original Series The series' actual title Star Trek is now often used to refer collectively to the original series and its multitude of spin-offs.
Star Wars: Episode IV – A New Hope  Originally released in 1977 under the title Star Wars. The new title was applied to a 1979 publication of the script and (following the 1980 release of Star Wars: Episode V – The Empire Strikes Back) to a 1981 amended re-release of the original film.
 Static electricity  see triboelectricity, below.
 Steam train  In the 19th century, before the advent of electric and diesel-powered trains, steam trains were just "trains".
 Strike-anywhere match  After the development of the safety match, that could only be lit by striking a custom surface containing phosphorus, the older non-safety matches were still in demand.
 Studio recording, studio album  Before live albums, music for distribution on records was only recorded in a studio.
 Super Mario Bros.: The Lost Levels In 1986, the first sequel to the hit NES game Super Mario Bros. was released in Japan as Super Mario Bros. 2. Because of its extreme difficulty and similarity to its predecessor, Nintendo of America opted not to release the game in North America. Instead, Nintendo released a remake of Yume Kōjō: Doki Doki Panic as the North American Super Mario Bros. 2 in 1988. The original sequel was eventually rereleased worldwide as part of the Super Mario All-Stars compilation, but under the moniker Super Mario Bros.: The Lost Levels. Outside of Japan, this name persists.
 Super Mario USA When the American Super Mario Bros. 2 was released in Japan, it was retitled Super Mario USA.
Surface mail  Traditional mail, delivered by road, rail, and ship, retrospectively named following the development of airmail. Compare snail mail, above.
Survivor: Borneo  Broadcast as just Survivor. When the show subsequently used other locales, the location of the first season was added to the title to distinguish it.
 Terrestrial radio As opposed to satellite radio.
 Terrestrial television As opposed to satellite television and cable television.
 Textile top convertible  Before retractable hardtops became popular, convertibles mostly had textile tops which folded when stowed away for a top-down ride.
 Text-only dialogue Before voice acting became commonplace in video games, text was used to convey dialogue between characters (especially in genres such as RPGs and adventure games). Some games, such as the Yakuza series, still uses text-only dialogue in addition to voice acting, depending on the importance of a cutscene. 
 Tie-on pocket  Early pockets were pouches, similar to a purse, tied around the waist and worn underneath the wearer's outer garments.  Once pockets began to be sewn directly into clothing, these pouch-like pockets needed to be differentiated from those that had been integrated into the garment.
 Transformers: Generation 1  referring to the original Transformers toyline which ran from 1984 to 1992, and the assorted tie-in media. Then known only as "The Transformers", when the sequel series, Transformers: Generation 2 launched by Hasbro in 1993, all previous subject matter was dubbed "Generation 1" – many individuals did this independently, as it is a logical progression, and when the online fandom began growing in the 1990s, the term became the definitive one for that era. The term subsequently made it into official use through toy reissues and comic books, most notably on Japanese toy packaging.
 Triboelectricity  Electricity was so named from the Greek word for amber, because of the discovery that if it was rubbed (generating what is now called triboelectricity) it would attract objects (due to a charge of static electricity). Electric currents and other forms of generation were discovered later.
Tube amplifier  Tube amplifiers for musical instruments were largely replaced by "transistor" (or solid state) amplifiers during the 1960s and 1970s.
Tube TV or CRT TV  Originally, all televisions used a cathode ray tube (CRT) to produce a TV image. But with the recent popularity of newer television technologies such as LCD, plasma, or DLP, some stores now describe the sets that still use a picture tube as tube TVs or CRT TVs.
 Two-door coupe Before four-door cars started to have coupe-like styling in recent years, coupe mostly referred to 2-door cars.  Examples of 4-door cars that have coupe used as a marketing term are the BMW X6 SUV and the Dodge Charger sedan which re-uses the name of a 1970s 2-door car.
 Ultimate Doom Before Doom II, Ultimate Doom was originally just simply Doom.  Doom was originally just a mail-order game, then when Doom II sold successfully in stores, Doom was re-released as a retail product, it was dubbed Ultimate Doom to differentiate from Doom II.  It added a new episode called Thy Flesh Consumed.
 Uncontrolled road (or uncontrolled highway)  Before the concept of controlled-access roads, which some call expressways came along, even predating automobiles, all roads had direct access to private property or public event or government grounds.  When the controlled-access roads came along, they helped to virtually eliminate direct driveway access to private property or parking lots with only select crossroads for direct access.  One had to use the term uncontrolled road to differentiate.  However, the introduction of freeways (which other countries referred to as autoroutes, motorways and whatnot) further complicated matters by necessitating the use of the term at-grade expressway (see above).  Recent uncontrolled roads have even adopted qualities of freeways and expressways such as paved shoulders (sometimes with rumble strips), freeway speed limits, and grade-separated ramp junctions (though most are just the at-grade "guest" of diamond junctions).
 Unstyled John Deere tractor After industrial design was applied to the sheet metal styling of John Deere tractors, the distinction unstyled was retronymously applied to earlier models whose model name was the same, for example, styled Model A versus unstyled Model A
 Upright bicycle The advent of the Recumbent bicycle sometimes requires a speaker to make the distinction between that and the conventional "upright bicycle".
 Vanilla Doom The advent of source ports for Doom have altered gameplay behavior.
 Viennese waltz  The original waltz, as distinct from other styles of waltz that have since developed.
 Visible light  Before the discovery of invisible wavelengths of electromagnetic radiation, all light was considered visible.
 Water-activated stamps (gummed stamps)  The predominant kind of postage stamp before self-adhesive stamps became popular.
 Web 1.0  a term used from the mid-2000s onward to refer to the World Wide Web / Internet of the 1990s and early 2000s.  At the time, it was referred to simply as "the web" or (less accurately) "the internet" or "the net".
 Whole milk  Milk was formerly available in just one version, with the cream included, and benefited eventually by pasteurization and homogenization. But it was still called simply milk.  This variety of milk is now referred to in the U.S. as whole milk (3.25% milkfat) to distinguish it from 2% (reduced fat) milk, 1% (low fat) milk, and skim milk (nearly no fat).  In the UK, the terms whole milk (also full-cream milk or full-fat milk) (3.5%), semi-skimmed milk (about 1.5%) and skimmed milk (almost no fat) are commonly used.
 Whole wheat  All flour, bread, pasta, etc. consisted of some combination of endosperm, germ and bran before white flour was created in the mid 19th century and became the more dominant variant when referring to flour.
 Windows 10, version 1507
 Win16  The original, 16-bit Windows API, as distinguished from the newer Win32 and Win64.
 Windows 8.0
 Zorro I The original Amiga (Amiga 1000) computer expansion bus was simply "Zorro" before the Amiga Zorro II was developed for the next generation Amiga, the Amiga 2000.
 Zune 30  Used to describe the first-generation Zune device; the "30" was added after the release of the Zune 4, 8, and 80

Geographic retronyms
Proper names
These are proper names for the described regions, or corridors.
 Abandoned Pennsylvania Turnpike  A section of the Pennsylvania Turnpike between Breezewood and Hustontown which was bypassed by a new alignment that bypassed the tunnels because it was too costly to blast away more rock to widen the travel lanes.
 Asia Minor  The name Asia was first applied to the mainland east of the Aegean islands, and later extended to the greater landmass of which that is a peninsula.
 Baja California  The name California was first applied to the peninsula (thought to be an island) now known as Baja ("Lower"), and later extended – and then restricted – to Alta ("Upper") California, and finally to the current U.S. state.
 East Indies  After Columbus landed in the West Indies.
 East Prussia  Prussia began as a duchy, in what is now Poland. As the highest-ranking dignity of the Hohenzollern dynasty, the name came to be applied to their territories stretching across Germany. The name East Prussia became more significant when it was separated from the rest of Prussia and Germany by the Polish Corridor.
 EUxx "EU" followed by two digits is often used in statistics to indicate the different makeup of the European Union
EU12: the twelve-member EU as founded in 1993; most of the Western European nations
EU15: the fifteen-member EU after Austria, Finland and Sweden joined in 1995
EU25: the EU from 2004 to 2007 after ten eastern and central European nations joined
EU27: the EU from 2007 to 2013, after Romania and Bulgaria were added
EU28: the EU from 2013 to 2020, after Croatia joined
EU27 is now used to refer to the EU after the United Kingdom left in 2020; it was also used after the 2016 Brexit referendum to refer to "the EU countries less the UK" as they negotiated with the UK government
 First Chinatown First Chinatown refers to Toronto's original Chinatown at Dundas and Elizabeth Streets in The Ward, and was known as such until the construction of the new city hall and public square in the 1960s. Most stores that occupied the construction project was cleared through expropriation. The resulting development caused the westward relocation of Chinatown to its current location at Dundas Street and Spadina Avenue. 
 Great Britain  Britons fleeing the Germanic invasions settled in Armorica which became Brittany or Little Britannia.
 Lower Saxony  The kingdom and duchies of Saxony are outside the original lowland territory of the Saxon people.
 Manhattan Chinatown  For a long time, New York City had only one Chinatown. However, there are now large Chinese communities in Flushing, Queens and Sunset Park, Brooklyn, and thus, a need has developed to differentiate among the city's three Chinatowns.
 Old Chinatown  London's original Chinatown (destroyed in The Blitz) was in Limehouse; the new Chinatown is in Soho. Also used in Houston, TX to the Chinatown district located east of the George R. Brown Convention Center and south of BBVA/Compass Stadium.
 Old Toronto  Old Toronto refers to the old City of Toronto, prior to the amalgamation of Toronto in 1998. In 1998, the Government of Ontario dissolved the regional municipality of Metropolitan Toronto, as well as the region's constituent municipalities (including Old Toronto). The former municipalities that made up Metropolitan Toronto were amalgamated into a single entity, the present-day city of Toronto.
 Old World After Columbus landed in the Americas ("The New World").
 Old Northwest, Old Southwest and Old West Regions formerly at these extreme corners of the United States.

General descriptions
These are less official descriptions that are commonly used.
 Contiguous United States or Lower 48  Referred to simply as The United States before Alaska and Hawaii, which are American exclaves, became states.

Historiographic retronyms
 Aztec Empire  Term coined by Alexander von Humboldt in the early 19th Century to differentiate between the pre-Hispanic "Mexican empire" and the then new post-Hispanic one (this, in turn, became known as the First Mexican Empire upon the French-backed enthronement of Maximilian I in 1864).
 Byzantine Empire  Term coined in 1557 to name the East Roman Empire, then defunct by over a century, in the historical period following the disintegration of the Western Roman Empire in 476 AD. The entity was commonly known as 'Roman Empire' to its inhabitants and 'Greek Empire' to contemporary Western Europeans.
 Gran Colombia  Historians' term for the first "Republic of Colombia", which included what are now Colombia, Venezuela, Ecuador, and Panama.
 Polish–Lithuanian Commonwealth  Term coined in the 20th century, after the restoration of separate Poland and Lithuania as independent states.
 Weimar Republic  Used to refer to the German Reich during the period in which it was a liberal democracy, prior to being taken over by the Nazi Party.
 World War I/First World War  Originally this was called "The Great War" and commonly believed to be "the war to end all wars". However, when a second war enveloped Europe, Asia, and much of the Pacific, it became necessary to distinguish them. This convention has been used for many series of wars, going back as far as the First Peloponnesian War or earlier. Most recently, the 1991 war in the Persian Gulf, formerly called "Desert Storm" or just the "Gulf War", is now (since the 2003 invasion of Iraq) often referred to as "The First Gulf War".

Airports

When an airport consists of only one passenger facility, most people just call it "The airport" or "The terminal".  But when an airport expands, it is often necessary to give the original building a retronymic adjective to avoid confusion.  While some airports just rename older terminals or concourse with letters or numbers (e.g. Terminal 1 or Concourse B), other methods include:
 Cardinal directions – when Newark opened Terminals A and B in the early 1970s, the existing passenger terminal was renamed the "North Terminal".
 Proper names – Detroit Metro Airport only had one passenger terminal until 1966, at which point the existing facility was identified as the "L.C. Smith Terminal".

Disputed retronyms 
Note: These terms imply age-old concepts, but the terms are usually applied to newer concepts with similar qualities.  Since some of these terms fall under different contexts, that's where the confusion comes in.

2.5D  2.5D generally refers to computer data which uses 2D plane data to render in 3D, and sometimes 2D sprites in that environment too; in which Doom and Duke Nukem 3D famously had this.  However 3D structures in general have existed before computers, but the term 2.5D was coined after computer games (and CAD) fully went 3D.
Bose Acoustic Wave System  The Bose Acoustic Wave System was the first Bose product to use the term "Wave System" in its name.  Newcomers to the Bose audio product lineup would think that this was just their top-of-the-line product, but this product was introduced prior to the introduction of Bose's simple Wave Radio (or Wave System) products, in which the simpler Wave Systems were cost-reduced versions of the "Wave" System lineup, but the name "Acoustic Wave System" was used before Wave by itself was used, in which is somewhat arguable to historians.
Disney's Aladdin  In the early days of the Disney's Aladdin media franchise, when the 1992 Disney film Aladdin first came out, the media franchise was simply just known as Aladdin.  But other movies and media bearing the name Aladdin existed before this media franchise, so later on the name Disney's Aladdin would come along to clear things up.
Expressway  The term expressway often refers to continuous highways with no private driveways but sometimes they have at-grade intersections.  But in some jurisdictions it is synonymous with freeways, which have 100% grade separations.  The term expressway wasn't coined until freeways were built, but the expressway concept itself has existed before freeways, in which because the term is sometimes synonymous with freeway, this is why the term at-grade expressway is sometimes used in reference to expressways with at-grade intersections.
Mechless car stereo  Most car stereo had no "moving parts" prior to the introduction of interchangeable media such as vinyl records (Highway Hifi by Chrysler), 8-track cartridges, compact cassettes and CDs, but recent omission of CD players (cassette player omission prior) has left the systems mechless when solid-state means to play audio with MP3 and other file format support such as secure digital, compact flash and USB came along, of which many of these systems have an analog AUX input.  The term mechless usually refers to more recent systems, thus it disputes its status as a "retronym".  Occasionally, many car stereos are AM/FM only without AUX inputs, in which it is possible to use FM transmitters with them.  Another thing that disputes this retronym, is that earlier AM/FM tuners had moving parts of their own just for the adjustment of frequencies (i.e. a string-driven variable capacitor and a static frequency display with a moving needle) prior to the introduction of digital readout with endless loop tuning (and later endless loop seek tuning) in the early 1980s.
Nintendo 2DS  Before Nintendo 3DS came out, all Nintendo DSes were 2D to the meatspace level.  However the product officially known as the Nintendo 2DS is simply a console that is capable of running 3DS games but without the parallax effect.  2DS doesn't refer to pre-3DS models, which is why this is a "disputed retronym".
 Solo motorcycle  So called instead of motorcycle when some were being built with a sidecar.  However, this retronym has gone into dispute because the so-called solo motorcycle can accommodate two passengers by itself.
 Push lawnmower  With the introduction of lawnmowers powered by gasoline (petrol or petroleum spirit outside the U.S.) and electricity, the manually propelled lawnmower became known as the push mower.  After self-propelled "riding" mowers became common, the term push mower was also applied to non-riding mowers.
 Sonic 3 & Knuckles The video game Sonic the Hedgehog 3 was supposed to have featured more stages, most which ended up being included in the later released Sonic & Knuckles.  However, time and cost constraints forced the game cartridge to be "two interlocking pieces" since Sega, back in late 1993 had to make a big compromise in order to ensure a fair cost for a stand-alone cartridge for the Mega Drive/Genesis.  Having a cartridge with enough capacity for both games on its own as "one giant game" could have meant pushing the cost up too high for an integrated product, so the game resulted in having Sonic & Knuckles exist as its own cartridge which had a "lock on" cartridge port in order to include Sonic 3 levels.  Sonic 3 itself wasn't marketed to have Sonic & Knuckles levels even though original plans wanted to include them, so in some contexts, the name "Sonic 3 & Knuckles" as a subgame using a cartridge would be disputed as a "retronym" for Sonic 3 as a game.
Standard transmission  In the traditional sense, the term "standard" transmission refers to manual transmissions.  However, in some markets, automatic transmissions are nowadays more common and thus would be considered "standard".
 Wet signature or wet-ink signature a handwritten signature, as opposed to an electronic signature.
Xbox One  The "Xbox One" (alternatively spelled "Xbox 1") used to be a colloquial nickname for the original Xbox video game console following the launch of the Xbox 360. However, this felt into disuse when Microsoft introduced the Xbox One, the third generation of the brand, to the market.

Double retronyms
Double-retronyms in general may just be the differentiation of adjectives and nouns that form retronyms in the first place, but there are other scenarios, such as political bodies splitting apart where there is simultaneous coinage of new names but no confirmed "original" is claimed.  The nouns are in alphabetical order:

North Carolina and South Carolina In general this area is referred to as The Carolinas, but this former province was split around 1729.
East Germany and West Germany The splitting of Germany from 1945 to 1990 after World War II led to the construction of the infamous Berlin Wall in 1961.
Inverse Double retronym
Where the introduction of a double retronym makes the adjective factually incorrect.

Southern Ireland
The most northerly tip of the Island of Ireland is in the Republic of Ireland which is otherwise known as Southern Ireland

References

Retronyms